Paul Stevens (born November 26, 1953) is an American college baseball coach who has been as an assistant coach for the University of Chicago Maroons baseball team since 2016. Before coming to Chicago, he was the head coach of the Northwestern Wildcats baseball program for 28 seasons, from 1988 through 2015. He is the winningest coach in Northwestern's program history, with over 600 wins. At Northwestern, Stevens has had 67 players drafted by Major League Baseball teams or signed to professional contracts. Stevens coached 94 All-Big Ten players, including four-time World Series champion Joe Girardi, two-time Major League Baseball All-Star Mark Loretta, and Toronto Blue Jays' J.A. Happ. Stevens announced his retirement partway through the 2015 season and stepped down at the end of the year.

Stevens played for two seasons at South Alabama before transferring to Lewis.  He earned a Silver Medal with the U.S. team at the 1975 Pan American Games.  He was drafted by the Kansas City Royals and played for three seasons in the Royals organization.  Stevens then served as a scout for the New York Mets before becoming an assistant at Northwestern in 1985.  After three years, he was promoted to head coach.  Under Stevens, the Wildcats had three 30-win seasons.  Stevens coached more games than any other coach in Northwestern history, over 500 more than second-place George McKinnon. He was named Big Ten Coach of the Year in 1991, 1995, and 2006

Head coaching record
The following lists Stevens' record as a head coach.

References

External links
 Chicago profile
 

1953 births
Living people
Chicago Maroons baseball coaches
Lewis Flyers baseball players
New York Mets scouts
Northwestern Wildcats baseball coaches
South Alabama Jaguars baseball players
Baseball players at the 1975 Pan American Games
Pan American Games medalists in baseball
Pan American Games silver medalists for the United States
People from Oak Lawn, Illinois
Medalists at the 1975 Pan American Games
Daytona Beach Islanders players
Gulf Coast Royals players
Grays Harbor Loggers players
Modesto A's players
Ogden A's players
Victoria Mussels players
Waterbury A's players
West Haven Whitecaps players